Kyle K. Biggar, Ph.D (born 1986) is a Canadian biochemist and molecular biologist. He has been a professor of biochemistry, chemistry, and biology at Carleton University in Ottawa, Canada since 2017. Biggar was the 2016 recipient of the John Charles Polanyi Prize for his outstanding work in early career research.

Biography
Kyle Kevin Biggar was born in 1986 in Summerside, Prince Edward Island. Biggar studied Biology and Chemistry at St. Francis Xavier University (B.Sc) in Antigonish, Nova-Scotia, Canada, and Biology and Biochemistry at Carleton University (Ph.D 2013). His doctoral research focused on the biochemistry of physiological stress response. The well-known Canadian biochemist Kenneth B. Storey was his thesis advisor during his graduate studies at Carleton University. After completing a post-doctoral fellowship at the University of Western Ontario Schulich School of Medicine and Dentistry, Biggar came back to his alma mater to become an assistant professor of Biochemistry as of 2016.

Research
Biggar's research includes many different areas from different fields within molecular biology, biochemistry, and physical biochemistry. His main areas of research interest are Oxidative Cell Stress, Functional Proteomics, Bioinformatics, and Molecular Pharmacology. He is particularly known for his research in the new field of Non-histone Lysine Methylation and its relation to both functional proteomics and cell stress.

Professional honours
Biggar was the 2016 recipient of the John Charles Polanyi Prize for outstanding work in early career research.

Selected recent publications
 Biggar, K.K., and Storey, K.B. Functional impact of non-coding RNA regulation in extreme stress adaptation. J. Mol. Cell. Biol. In Press. doi.org/10.1093/jmcb/mjx053
 Biggar, K.K., Wang Z. and Li, S. SnapShot: Lysine methylation beyond histones. Mol. Cell 68(5):1016–1016.e1. Invited submission
 Singal, S.S., Nygard, K.*,Biggar, K.K.*, Shehab, M.A., S.S.C. Li,  Jansson, T. and Gupta, M.B.  Interaction between IGFBP-1, protein kinase CSNK-2 and mTOR in HepG2 cells as demonstrated by dual immunofluorescence and in situ PLA. Am. J. Pathol. In press, doi.org/10.1016/j.ajpath.2017.09.009
 Biggar, K.K., Dawson, N.J. and Storey, K.B. Native protein denaturation using urea. Biotechniques 62(1): xiii (epub)
 Shehab, M.A., Biggar, K.K., Singal, S.S., Nygard, K., Li, S.S.C., Jansson, T. and Gupta, M.B. Exposure of decidualized HESC to low oxygen tension and leucine deprivation results in increased IGFBP-1 phosphorylation and reduced IGF-I bioactivity. Mol. Cell. Endo. 452:1-14
 Wu, Z., Connolly, J. and Biggar, K.K. Beyond histones: The expanding roles of lysine methylation. FEBS J. 284(17): 2732-2744
 Biggar, K.K. and Storey, K.B. Exploration of low temperature microRNA function in an anoxia tolerant vertebrate ectotherm, the red eared slider turtle (Trachemys scripta elegans). J. Thermal Biol. In Press
 Wu, C.W., Biggar, K.K., Luu, B.E., Szereszewski, K.E. and Storey, K.B. Analysis of microRNA expression during the torpor-arousal cycle of a mammalian hibernator, the 13-lined ground squirrel. Physiol. Genomics DOI: 10.1152/physiolgenomics.00005.2016

References

1986 births
Living people
Canadian biochemists
Carleton University alumni
Academic staff of Carleton University
People from Summerside, Prince Edward Island
St. Francis Xavier University alumni